Warren Woods State Park is a  nature preserve and public recreation area in Berrien County, Michigan, near the town of Three Oaks. The state park is leased by private owners to the state of Michigan.

History
The woods are named for Edward Kirk Warren (1847-1919), the inventor of the featherbone corset (which replaced the whalebone corset with turkey bones and secured his fortune).

Natural features
The park is home to the last climax beech-maple forest in Michigan, which occupies . The remaining area in the park consists of floodplain oak-hickory forest. Because of the size and age of the trees, and the rarity of the ecosystem, the area has been designated since 1967 as a National Natural Landmark. Many of the beeches, with their smooth, thin, silver-grey bark, are heavily scarred by hand-carved graffiti, some of it decades old; however, the practice seems to have fallen out of favor in recent years.

Activities and amenities
The park has few facilities and is administered by nearby Warren Dunes State Park. In the middle of the park the trail crosses the Galien River on a pedestrian bridge, where there is an interpretive station. The park contains the  Warren Woods Ecological Field Station owned and operated by the University of Chicago. Birders cite the park as a particularly good place to spot pileated woodpeckers. Other visitors come to picnic. The park is the subject of ecological studies because, in combination with the ecosystems preserved in nearby Warren Dunes State Park, it completes a progression of ecological seres.

References

External links 

Warren Woods State Park Michigan Department of Natural Resources
Warren Woods State Park Map Michigan Department of Natural Resources

State parks of Michigan
Protected areas of Berrien County, Michigan
National Natural Landmarks in Michigan
Protected areas established in 1930
1930 establishments in Michigan
IUCN Category III
Old-growth forests